Hair follicle nevus is a cutaneous condition that presents as a small papule from which fine hairs protrude evenly from the surface.

See also 
 Skin lesion
 List of cutaneous conditions

References 

Conditions of the skin appendages
Human hair
Hair diseases